This is a list of songs that have peaked at number one on the Billboard Hot 100 and the magazine's national singles charts that preceded it. Introduced in 1958, the Hot 100 is the pre-eminent singles chart in the United States, currently monitoring the most popular singles in terms of popular radio play,  single purchases and online streaming.

Preface
The following year-by-year, week-by-week listings are based on statistics accrued by Billboard magazine before and after the inception of its Hot 100 popularity chart in August 1958.

All data  is pooled from record purchases and radio/jukebox  play within the United States. Later charts also include digital single sales, online streaming, and YouTube hits.

Pre-Hot 100 era

Hot 100 era

Sources
The following sources apply to all "by year" pages linked above:
Fred Bronson's Billboard Book of Number 1 Hits, 5th Edition
Joel Whitburn's Top Pop Singles 1955-2008, 12 Edition
Joel Whitburn Presents the Billboard Pop Charts, 1955-1959
Joel Whitburn Presents the Billboard Hot 100 Charts: The Sixties
Joel Whitburn Presents the Billboard Hot 100 Charts: The Seventies
Joel Whitburn Presents the Billboard Hot 100 Charts: The Eighties
Joel Whitburn Presents the Billboard Hot 100 Charts: The Nineties
Joel Whitburn Presents the Billboard Hot 100 Charts: The 2000s
Additional information obtained can be verified within Billboard's online archive services and print editions of the magazine.

See also 
 List of Billboard Hot 100 top-ten singles
 List of number-one adult contemporary hits (United States)
 List of number-one country hits (United States)
 List of number-one dance hits (United States)
 List of number-one dance airplay hits (U.S.)
 List of Billboard Mainstream Rock number-one songs of the 1980s
 List of number-one alternative hits (United States)
 List of number-one rhythm and blues hits (United States)
 List of artists who reached number one in the United States
 Billboard Year-End

Number-one hits (United States)